Martin Visser born on the 10th of July 1968 is a Dutch fashion designer from Sleeuwijk, Netherlands. He studied fashion and design at the Hoge School Amsterdam, The Amsterdam Fashion Academy (formerly known as Charles Montaigne) and the Saga International Design Centre in Copenhagen.

He has had his own collection since 1993. The store Mart Visser Haute Couture is located in Amsterdam, Netherlands.

In 2009, Visser designed new uniforms for KLM Royal Dutch Airlines for female pilots, cabin and ground crews, consisting of a capsule wardrobe of 11 pieces.

References

External links
 Mart Visser

1968 births
Living people
Dutch fashion designers
People from Sleeuwijk